During the 1912–13 English football season, Brentford competed in the Southern League First Division. Two long losing runs led to the Bees' relegation to the Second Division on the final day of the season.

Season summary

After three consecutive mid-table seasons, Southern League First Division club Brentford's directors gambled on generating extra income by also entering the Southern Alliance. Consequently, a larger squad was assembled, with many of the previous season's professionals retained. Willis Rippon was the only significant departure – sold for £250 to Hamilton Academical. Secretary-manager Fred Halliday brought in goalkeeper Ted Price, full back Tommy Fells, centre half Frank Bentley and forwards Frederick Chapple and James Morrison. 

Brentford had a torrid beginning to the season, losing 12 of the first 15 matches. Of the starting forward line of Billy Brawn, Jack Sibbald, Frederick Chapple, Bob McTavish and Patsy Hendren, Chapple and Hendren were the only players to score during the period, which lead manager Halliday to sign Chelsea's Hugh Dolby and Bill Smith from non-league football. Dolby failed to score in four matches and was dropped, while Smith helped contribute to a revival in mid-November, after full back Dusty Rhodes replaced Fred Halliday as manager on 13 November 1912. Between 9 November and 5 March 1913, Brentford lost just three matches, but another loss of form and injuries to the forward line led to seven consecutive defeats in March. A crucial 4–1 victory over Brighton & Hove Albion on 5 April boosted the Bees' survival chances, but a defeat and a win in the following two matches respectively put Brentford one place above the relegation zone going into the final day, level on points with Norwich City, but ahead by virtue of a 0.774 goal average.

Brentford would play away to Merthyr Town and Norwich City away to Reading on Saturday 26 April, but torrential rain and gale force winds forced the Bees' match to be postponed twice, to the following Tuesday. Norwich City won their match 5–2, but the scoreline would not guarantee the Canaries' safety on goal average if Brentford won their match by any score. On Tuesday 29 April, Brentford conceded the opening goal to Merthyr Town, before Bill Smith equalised two minutes after half time. In the final 10 minutes, Brentford pushed forward and were hit on the break with just two minutes remaining, losing the match 2–1 and with it the club's First Division status.

League table

Results
Brentford's goal tally listed first.

Legend

Southern League First Division

FA Cup

 Source: 100 Years Of Brentford

Playing squad 
Players' ages are as of the opening day of the 1912–13 season.

 Source: 100 Years Of Brentford, Football League Players' Records 1888 to 1939

Coaching staff

Fred Halliday (4 September–13 November 1912)

Dusty Rhodes (13 November 1912 – 29 April 1913)

Statistics

Appearances and goals

Players listed in italics left the club mid-season.
Source: 100 Years Of Brentford

Goalscorers 

Players listed in italics left the club mid-season.
Source: 100 Years Of Brentford

Amateur international caps

Management

Summary

Transfers & loans

Notes

References 

Brentford F.C. seasons
Brentford